Comatised is the 2000 debut album by Leona Naess, produced by MCA Records.  The tracks "Charm Attack" and "Lazy Days" were featured in the teen comedy film Whatever It Takes and the primetime drama The O.C., respectively. The single "Charm Attack" reached #29 on the Billboard Adult Top 40.

Track listing 
 "Lazy Days" – 5:11
 "Charm Attack" – 4:24
 "Chase" – 3:19
 "Lonely Boy" – 6:03
 "Anything" – 4:06
 "Chosen Family" – 3:47
 "Comatised" – 3:56
 "All I Want" – 3:43
 "Northern Star" – 4:02
 "Earthquake" – 4:13
 "New York Baby" – 4:46
 "Paper Thin" – 10:47

"New York Baby" (Alternate Mix) is a hidden track at the end of the album.
"The Moon And I" is a bonus track on the Japan version of the album.

Notes 

2000 debut albums
Leona Naess albums
Albums produced by Scott Litt
MCA Records albums